Jurchen may refer to:

 Jurchen people, Tungusic people who inhabited the region of Manchuria until the 17th century
 Haixi Jurchens, a grouping of the Jurchens as identified by the Chinese of the Ming Dynasty
 Jianzhou Jurchens, a grouping of the Jurchens as identified by the Chinese of the Ming Dynasty
 Wild Jurchens, a grouping of the Jurchens as identified by the Chinese of the Ming Dynasty
 Jurchen script, writing system of Jurchen people
 Jurchen language, extinct language spoken by Jurchen people
 Jin dynasty (1115–1234), also known as the Jurchen Dynasty

Language and nationality disambiguation pages